Christian Mendy (born 7 November 1984) is a French-Senegalese former professional footballer who played as a forward.

Career
Mendy was born in Boutoupa, Senegal. After playing for Stade Lavallois in Ligue 2, he joined Deportivo Alavés on a five-year contract in October 2004. He went on to play for SO Romorantin, Italian side AC Crevalcore, RCF Paris, FC Martigues, Red Star Saint-Ouen, and FC Versailles 78.

References

External links
 
 Profile at Foot National
 

1984 births
Living people
Association football forwards
French footballers
Senegalese footballers
Ligue 2 players
Championnat National players
Championnat National 2 players
Stade Lavallois players
Deportivo Alavés players
SO Romorantin players
Racing Club de France Football players
FC Martigues players
Red Star F.C. players
FC Versailles 78 players
French expatriate footballers
French expatriate sportspeople in Spain
Expatriate footballers in Spain
French expatriate sportspeople in Italy
Expatriate footballers in Italy